Vəlixanlı (also, Velikhanly) is a village and municipality in the Yardymli Rayon of Azerbaijan.

References 

Populated places in Yardimli District